Clarence Earl Walker is an American historian and Distinguished Professor (Emeritus) in the Department of History at the University of California, Davis. He earned bachelor's and master's degrees from San Francisco State University and a doctorate from the University of California, Berkeley.

Walker works on Black American studies. In 2001, his book We Can't Go Home Again: An Argument About Afrocentrism was selected as an International Book of the Year by The Times Literary Supplement.

In 2015, he was awarded the US$45000 UC Davis Prize for Undergraduate Teaching and Scholarly Achievement. He planned to retire in June 2015.

His publications include:
 Mongrel Nation: The America Begotten by Thomas Jefferson and Sally Hemings,  University of Virginia Press, 2009
 We Can't Go Home Again: An Argument About Afrocentrism, Oxford University Press, 2001
 Deromanticizing Black History: Critical Essays and Reappraisals, University of Tennessee Press, 1991

References 

Year of birth missing (living people)
Living people
21st-century American historians
21st-century American male writers
University of California, Davis faculty
San Francisco State University alumni
University of California, Berkeley alumni
American male non-fiction writers